Princess Marie Thérèse of Bourbon-Parma (Spanish: María Teresa de Borbón-Parma, French: Marie-Thérèse de Bourbon-Parme; 28 July 1933 – 26 March 2020) was a French-Spanish political activist and academic. She was a member of the House of Bourbon-Parma, a cadet branch of the Spanish royal family. She was a socialist activist, earning the nickname Red Princess, and a monarchist who supported the Carlist movement. She is the first royal known to have died of COVID-19.

Early life and education 
Princess Marie Thérèse was born on 28 July 1933 in Paris. She was the daughter of Prince Xavier of Bourbon-Parma, Duke of Parma and Piacenza, a Carlist claimant to the Spanish throne, and Madeleine de Bourbon-Busset, a member of a cadet branch of the House of Bourbon. She was the younger sister of Princess Marie Françoise and Carlos Hugo, Duke of Parma, and an older sister of Princess Cécile Marie, Princess Marie des Neiges and Prince Sixtus Henry, Duke of Aranjuez. She was a niece of Zita of Bourbon-Parma, the last Empress of Austria and Queen of Hungary and Bohemia.

She grew up at the Chateau du Bostz, Besson, Bourbonnais. Having attended middle school in Tours, she went on to obtain a doctorate in Hispanic studies from Paris-Sorbonne University and another doctorate in political sociology from the Complutense University of Madrid. She also studied Islam and how it related to women's rights. Her 1977 thesis at the Sorbonne was entitled "La clarificación ideológica del Carlismo contemporáneo" ("Ideological clarification of contemporary Carlism").

Career and activism 
Marie-Thérèse was a professor at both of her alma maters. She was also a socialist activist and fought for women's rights. 

Marie-Thérèse supported her brother Carlos Hugo in his fight to make the Spanish Carlist party more liberal, supporting an ideological shift in her family's Carlism. Her royal roots and liberal socialist views attracted many personalities, leading her to meet André Malraux, François Mitterrand, Yasser Arafat and Hugo Chávez, and earned her the nickname of "Red Princess". This nickname was used as the (Spanish) title of a 2002 biography of María Teresa written by historian .

Personal life 
In 1981, Marie Thérèse acquired Spanish citizenship by royal decree; the official state bulletin said that it was given "at the request of the interested party and in response to the exceptional circumstances and her belonging to a family so closely linked to Spain".

In a 1997 interview, Marie Thérèse said that she was Christian, but criticized some Christian attitudes to immigration that sought to create a divide.

Marie Thérèse never married, and had no children. She was the aunt of Prince Carlos, Duke of Parma and 4th cousin, once removed, of the current King of Spain, Felipe VI.

In 2014, she published a history of the Bourbon-Parma family.

On 26 March 2020, Marie Thérèse became the first member of a royal family known to die of COVID-19. She died at Hôpital Cochin in Paris at the age of 86. A memorial service was held in Madrid on 27 March 2020, presided over by Rev. José Ramón García Gallardo, a priest of the Society of Saint Pius X and an officer of the Order of Prohibited Legitimacy. A second Catholic funeral was held on 2 April 2020 at Notre-Dame-des-Champs in Paris. Her death was announced on the official website of the House of Bourbon-Parma. Her family paid tribute to her involvement "in the struggle for democratization, social justice and freedom in Spain".

Marie Thérèse's funeral took place on 27 August 2021 at Sanctuary of Santa Maria della Steccata in Parma, and was buried there. The funeral mass held in Parma was attended by Prince Carlos Xavier, Duke of Parma and Piacenza; Princess Annemarie, Duchess of Parma and Piacenza; Prince Jaime, Count of Bardi; Princess Margarita, Countess of Colorno with her husband and daughters; Princess Maria Carolina, Marchioness of Sala with her husband and children; Princess Marie des Neiges, Countess of Castillo de la Mota; Princess Cécile Marie, Countess of Poblet and Princess Marie-Françoise, Dowager Princess of Lobkowicz.

Ancestry

Honours 
 :
 Senator Grand Cross with necklace of the Angelic Imperial Holy Constantinian Order of St. George
 Grand Cross of the Ducal Royal Order of Saint Louis
 Grand Cross of the Order of Prohibited Legitimacy

Bibliography

References

Further reading 
  (Biography)

External links 

Official website of the House of Bourbon-Parma
Second official website of the House of Bourbon-Parma
Biography of Her Royal Highness Princess Marie Thérèse

1933 births
2020 deaths
Complutense University of Madrid alumni
Deaths from the COVID-19 pandemic in France
Paris-Sorbonne University alumni
Carlists
Writers from Paris
Maria Teresa
Spanish monarchists
Spanish people of French descent
Spanish women academics
Complutense University of Madrid
Academic staff of Paris-Sorbonne University
20th-century Spanish women writers
Spanish women activists
21st-century Spanish women writers
Spanish women's rights activists
Spanish socialists
Spanish people of Italian descent
Spanish Roman Catholics
French monarchists
French women academics
20th-century French women writers
French women activists
21st-century French women writers
French women's rights activists
French socialists
French people of Italian descent
French Roman Catholics
Burials at the Sanctuary of Santa Maria della Steccata